Kaisa Launela (born 13 May 1948) is a Finnish athlete. She competed in the women's javelin throw at the 1968 Summer Olympics.

References

1948 births
Living people
Athletes (track and field) at the 1968 Summer Olympics
Finnish female javelin throwers
Olympic athletes of Finland
Place of birth missing (living people)